Aharon Gershgoren is an Israeli former footballer. He holds the most goals in a match record at Maccabi Haifa scoring six goals in one game.

External links
  Profile and biography of Aharon Gershgoren on Maccabi Haifa's official website

1948 births
Living people
Israeli Jews
Israeli footballers
Maccabi Haifa F.C. players
Footballers from Haifa
Association football midfielders